Kargar Metro Station is a station on Isfahan Metro Line 1. The station opened on 18 March 2018. It is located on Hezar Jarib at the intersection with Kargar St., the station's namesake. The next station on the north side is Daneshgah-e Esfahan Station and Kuy-e Emam Station on the south side. The station is located next to University of Isfahan campus.

References

Isfahan Metro stations
Railway stations opened in 2017